"The Day the Earth Stood Cool" is the seventh episode of the twenty-fourth season of the American animated television series The Simpsons. It originally aired on the Fox network in the United States on December 9, 2012.

Plot
Homer becomes upset when someone believes him to be Bart's grandfather, and worries that he is no longer cool. He then meets Terrance, a cool donut chef from Portland, who is looking for a new place for him and his family to live as he believes Portland has been "played out". When he tells Homer that he sees potential in Springfield, Homer suggests he buy the house next door to his, which he does.

The Simpsons meet Terrance's wife Emily, his pet armadillo Chuy, their daughter Corduroy and their son T-Rex, and get their first exposure to their way of life. While Homer and Lisa are immediately taken with the family, Bart is irritated by T-Rex's cynicism and Marge is uncomfortable in their presence, particularly of Emily's public breastfeeding. Despite this, Marge supports Homer in his desire to fit in with their lifestyle, and allows him to combine their yard with the neighbor's into a "mono-yard" and lets him, Bart and Lisa accompany Terrance and T-Rex to rock shows, Mexican wrestling, roller derby, Korean gangster films and Modern Art exhibitions, even though she grows concerned that the kids are becoming pretentious. The Simpsons are invited to T-Rex's birthday party, where Marge makes enemies of Emily and her fellow nursing mother friends by refusing to breast-feed Maggie. Meanwhile, T-Rex mocks Homer's present and calls him a poseur, which angers Bart, and he starts a fight with him. This causes friction between the families (Homer is uninvited to go midnight bike-riding), but when Bart explains himself, Homer decides to sever all ties with Terrance and his family.

Homer and Marge pressure Terrance and Emily to leave Springfield, but their "humble-bragging" of the town results in more cool people moving to Springfield. Their lifestyle quickly consumes the town; the Tire Fire becomes a Farmer's Market, the Android's Dungeon becomes a Taschen, King Toot's Music Store becomes King Toke's Medicinal Marijuana Centre, Springfield Elementary becomes a co-op, and the Kwik-E-Mart turns into Apu's House of Spats. Meanwhile, Bart makes up with T-Rex and invites him to watch TV with him. Excited by the prospect, he abandons his compost-turning duties and joins Bart. The unturned compost, however, catches fire and starts to spread. Homer and Terrance work together to put out the fire using large drums of baby formula Marge keeps in the garage. Terrence and Emily apologize to Homer and Marge for being so judgmental.

Shortly after, the New York Times names Springfield 'America's Coolest City', which means it is played out. Immediately upon hearing this, Terrance and Emily and the rest of the cool people move, much to Lisa's dismay.

Production
This is the fourth episode as show runner for longtime Simpsons writer Matt Selman. Selman had long had plans to eventually have the Simpsons visit Portland, an idea he first conceived after former Simpsons writer Bill Oakley moved to Oregon, but "that had to change once Portlandia made its successful debut." Oakley is now writing for Portlandia.  Armisen and Brownstein recorded their lines about a year in advance.

Reception

Ratings
The episode was watched by a total of 7.44 million viewers and it received a 3.4 rating in the 18-49 demographic making it the most watched show on Animation Domination that night in both total viewers and the 18-49 demographic.

Critical reception
The episode received mostly positive reception from critics and fans alike. Robert David Sullivan from The A.V. Club gave the episode a B+, saying, "It's one of the most disciplined Simpsons episodes ever, with no B-plots and nary a tangent, and it’s the most consistently funny so far this season."

References

External links 
 
 "The Day the Earth Stood Cool" at theSimpsons.com

The Simpsons (season 24) episodes
Portland, Oregon in fiction
2012 American television episodes
Television episodes directed by Matthew Faughnan
Hipster (contemporary subculture)